Brian Stuart McLean (born 28 February 1985) is a professional footballer who plays as a defender for Clyde. 

He began his career in Scotland as a youth and reserve player with Rangers before joining Motherwell in 2005, initially on loan. He then joined Falkirk in 2009 before joining Preston North End in England two years later. After returning to Scotland with Dundee United and then Ross County, he moved to DPMM FC in 2015 and won the S.League title in his first season. He then had a short spell at Hibernian and played in Iceland for ÍBV before returning for a second spell at DPMM FC in 2018. He returned to Scottish football at Dumbarton, where he spent the 2018-19 season, then signed for Greenock Morton in July 2019.

McLean played for the Scotland under-17 team before choosing to represent Northern Ireland, for whom he made one full international appearance in 2006. Due to an administrative error, however, he was subsequently declared ineligible to have switched his nationality, thus ending his international career.

Club career
McLean is primarily a centre back, but he can also play at right back or left back. Born in Rutherglen, he started his career as a youth player with Queen's Park before joining Rangers. However, a lack of first team opportunities led to him joining Motherwell on loan during the 2005–06 season. During his loan spell, he won the Scottish Premier League Young Player of the Month award for March 2006. Motherwell signed him on a permanent basis in April 2006 after he impressed during his loan spell.

On 18 July 2008 he suffered significant damage to his knee in a tackle by Argentinian striker Diego Ruiz during a pre-season friendly against CFR Cluj. He resumed a first team place on 28 March 2009, in a 2–1 win over Inverness Caledonian Thistle.

On 1 July 2009 he signed a two-year contract with Scottish Premier League side Falkirk. He became Eddie May's first signing, but Falkirk were relegated to the First Division in 2010. McLean left Falkirk at the end of the 2010–11 season.

McLean was signed by Football League One club Preston North End on a two-year contract, after a trial period, on 2 August 2011. McLean scored his first goal for Preston North End against Notts County from a Paul Parry corner, heading in from about six yards out. He was transfer listed by the club in May 2012.

He signed a two-year deal with Dundee United on 14 June 2012. On 25 July 2013, it was announced McLean had left Dundee United by mutual consent; he later signed for Ross County on 30 July 2013. He left Ross County at the end of the 2013–14 season.

On 16 February 2015, McLean signed for DPMM FC, a Bruneian football team playing in Singapore's S.League. He scored his first goal for the club against Hougang United on 4 April. He won the S.League title in his first season, scoring in every competition that he played in. He was released at the end of the 2016 season.

On 1 March 2017, McLean signed for Hibernian on a short-term contract. He left the club when it expired at the end of the season two months later.

After a spell in Iceland with ÍBV where he won the Icelandic Cup, he made a return to DPMM FC of Brunei in February 2018. He left the team once again after the season ended and signed a short-term deal with Scottish League One side Dumbarton in March 2019. He turned down the offer of a new deal with the club in May 2019.

McLean signed a one-year contract with Greenock Morton in July 2019.

International career
Despite being born in Scotland, McLean was eligible to play for Northern Ireland through his family. However, he had previously appeared for Scotland U17's in a UEFA competition in 2002, and was required to state his change of allegiance prior to his 21st birthday. Unfortunately, due to an administration error McLean was not registered before this deadline and is now ineligible to represent Northern Ireland, effectively ending his international career. During his short international career McLean did not appear in any competitive games, although he was due to play in the European Under-21 Championship qualifying game against Liechtenstein before being ruled ineligible.

Personal life
He is the son of former Kilmarnock player Stuart McLean and the brother of SFA referee Steven McLean.

Career statistics

Honours

Club
DPMM FC
Singaporean S.League: 2015

ÍBV
Icelandic Cup: 2017

Individual
Scottish Premier League Young Player of the Month: March 2006

See also
List of sportspeople who competed for more than one nation

References

External links

1985 births
Living people
Association football defenders
Scottish footballers
Association footballers from Northern Ireland
Northern Ireland under-21 international footballers
Northern Ireland international footballers
Scottish Premier League players
Expatriate footballers in Brunei
Queen's Park F.C. players
Rangers F.C. players
Motherwell F.C. players
Falkirk F.C. players
Preston North End F.C. players
Dundee United F.C. players
Ross County F.C. players
DPMM FC players
Scottish Football League players
Footballers from South Lanarkshire
Scotland youth international footballers
Scottish Professional Football League players
Scottish people of Northern Ireland descent
Scottish expatriate footballers
Hibernian F.C. players
Expatriate footballers in Iceland
Úrvalsdeild karla (football) players
Dumbarton F.C. players
Singapore Premier League players
Íþróttabandalag Vestmannaeyja players
Greenock Morton F.C. players
Clyde F.C. players